Tole Bi (Tóle bi),  before 1992 — Novotroitskoe — village, the center of Shu District, Jambyl Region, Kazakhstan. It is the administrative center of the Tole Bi rural district (KATO code — 316630100).

Geography

References

Notes

Sources
Е. М. Поспелов (Ye. M. Pospelov). "Имена городов: вчера и сегодня (1917–1992). Топонимический словарь." (City Names: Yesterday and Today (1917–1992). Toponymic Dictionary.) Москва, "Русские словари", 1993.

Populated places in Jambyl Region
Syr-Darya Oblast
Populated places along the Silk Road
Kazakhstan–Kyrgyzstan border crossings